Odo Marquard (26 February 1928 – 9 May 2015) was a German philosopher and academic. He was a professor of philosophy at the University of Giessen from 1965 to 1993. In 1984 he received the Sigmund Freud Prize for Scientific Prose.

Early life and education
Odo Marquard was born in Stolp, Farther Pomerania. He studied philosophy, German literature, and theology, obtaining his doctorate at the University of Münster and his habilitation at the University of Freiburg. In Münster he studied under Joachim Ritter, whose Ritter School he sometimes is considered a member of. An even greater influence was Max Müller, whom Marquard studied under in Freiburg, and his use of the philosophy of Edmund Husserl and Martin Heidegger to create a phenomenological update of neo-scholasticism.

Career
From 1965 to 1993, Marquard held a chair for philosophy at the University of Giessen, serving as dean of the philosophical faculty. In 1982–1983 he was a fellow at the Berlin Institute for Advanced Study. From 1985 to 1987 he was the president of the General Society for Philosophy in Germany.

In 1984 he was awarded the Sigmund Freud Prize for Scientific Prose by the Deutsche Akademie für Sprache und Dichtung. He was awarded the Erwin-Stein-Preis (1992), the Ernst-Robert-Curtius-Preis for essay writers (1996), the Hessian Cultural Prize for science (1997), the Hessian Order of Merit (1990) and two Orders of Merit of the Federal Republic of Germany: the Cross of Merit 1. Class (1995) and the Great Cross of Merit (2008). In 1994, the year after he became Professor Emeritus at Giessen, he received an honorary doctorate from the University of Jena.

Thought
A proponent of philosophical hermeneutics and skepticism, Marquard’s work focuses on aspects of human fallibility, contingency, and finitude. He rejected idealist, rationalist, and universalist conceptions, and defended philosophical particularism and pluralism. His essay "In Praise of Polytheism" provoked discussion and controversy in Germany. In it, he promotes a "disenchanted return of polytheism" as a political theology.

Criticized by Jürgen Habermas as a representative of German neoconservatism, his philosophy has been described as a form of liberal conservatism with various parallels to postmodern thought and the work of Richard Rorty.

Selected bibliography
Schwierigkeiten mit der Geschichtsphilosophie. Suhrkamp, Frankfurt am Main 1973, 
Abschied vom Prinzipiellen. Reclam, Stuttgart 1981, 
Apologie des Zufälligen. Reclam, Stuttgart 1986, 
Skepsis und Zustimmung. Reclam, Stuttgart 1994, 
Glück im Unglück. Fink, Munich 1995, 
Skepsis in der Moderne. Reclam, Stuttgart 2007,

Works in English translation
"On the importance of the theory of the unconscious for a theory of no longer fine art". Richard E. Amacher and Victor Lange (eds.) New perspectives in German literary criticism. Princeton, N.J.: Princeton University Press 1979. 
Farewell to Matters of Principle. Philosophical Studies. New York/Oxford: Oxford University Press 1989. 
In Defense of the Accidental. Philosophical Studies. New York/Oxford: Oxford University Press 1991. 
"Presentation off duty and depoliticised revolution. Philosophical remarks on art and politics". Christos M. Joachimides and Norman Rosenthal (eds.) The age of modernism. Art in the 20th century. G. Hatje: Stuttgart 1997, pp. 39–48. 
"Several connections between aesthetics and therapeutics in nineteenth-century philosophy". Judith Norman and Alistair Welchman (eds.) The new Schelling. London/New York: Continuum 2004.

References

Citations

Sources

Further reading

 
 
 

1928 births
2015 deaths
20th-century anthropologists
20th-century essayists
20th-century German male writers
20th-century German non-fiction writers
20th-century German philosophers
21st-century anthropologists
21st-century essayists
21st-century German male writers
21st-century German non-fiction writers
21st-century German philosophers
Academic staff of the University of Giessen
Aristotelian philosophers
Commanders Crosses of the Order of Merit of the Federal Republic of Germany
Consciousness researchers and theorists
Contemporary philosophers
Continental philosophers
Critical theorists
Critics of Christianity
Epistemologists
German anthropologists
German literary critics
German literary theorists
German male essayists
German male non-fiction writers
German male writers
German philosophers
German social commentators
Hermeneutists
Institute for Advanced Study faculty
Literacy and society theorists
Metaphysicians
Metaphysics writers
Ontologists
People from Słupsk
People from the Province of Pomerania
Phenomenologists
Philosophers of art
Philosophers of culture
Philosophers of education
Philosophers of literature
Philosophers of mind
Philosophers of religion
Philosophers of science
Philosophers of social science
Philosophy academics
Political philosophers
Political theologians
Scholastic philosophers
Social philosophers
Theorists on Western civilization
University of Freiburg alumni
University of Münster alumni
Writers about activism and social change
Writers about religion and science